Ricardo José Weberberger (5 September 1939 – 17 August 2010) was the Roman Catholic bishop of the Roman Catholic Diocese of Barreiras, Brazil.

Born in Austria, Weberberger was ordained a priest for the Benedictine order on 15 August 1964. On 21 May 1979 Weberberger was appointed bishop of the Barreiras Diocese and was ordained bishop on 11 July 1979, dying while in office.

Notes

20th-century Austrian Roman Catholic priests
20th-century Roman Catholic bishops in Brazil
Benedictine bishops
1939 births
2010 deaths
Roman Catholic bishops of Barreiras